Valentine George Robertson (11 April 1879 – 11 March 1940) was an Australian rules footballer who played with South Melbourne and St Kilda in the Victorian Football League (VFL).

Notes

External links 

1879 births
1940 deaths
Australian rules footballers from Melbourne
Sydney Swans players
St Kilda Football Club players
South Yarra Football Club players
People from South Yarra, Victoria